Grêmio Esportivo Brazlândia, formerly known as Sociedade Esportiva Brazlândia and commonly known as Brazlândia, is a Brazilian football club based in Brazlândia, Distrito Federal.

History
The club was founded on June 5, 1996. Brazlândia won the Campeonato Brasiliense Second Level in 2007.

Achievements

 Campeonato Brasiliense Second Level:
 Winners (1): 2007

Stadium
Sociedade Esportiva Brazlândia play their home games at Estádio Chapadinha. The stadium has a maximum capacity of 3,000 people.

References

Association football clubs established in 1996
Football clubs in Federal District (Brazil)
1996 establishments in Brazil